Jeanine Stoeten (born 20 November 1991 in Hengelo) is a Dutch volleyball player, who plays as a middle blocker. 
She is a member of the Netherlands Women's National Team.
She participated at the 2017 Montreux Volley Masters.

Life 
Stoeten started her career in her hometown at MTSH Hengelo. [1] 
Then, she played at Havoc Haaksbergen. 
In 2008, she moved to HAN Volleyball. 
A year later, she played as middle blocker of the first division VV Pollux Oldenzaal. 
In 2011, the club moved and was renamed Eurosped Almelo. 
In 2012-2013, she played for Irmato Weert. 
She then returned to Almelo. [5] 
With Eurosped Almelo, She won the national cup and played in the 2015–16 Women's CEV Cup. 

Subsequently, she played for the German Bundesliga club Ladies in Black Aachen. 
With the club she reached the quarter-finals in the 2016-2017 season in the Bundesliga play-offs and in the  2016-2017 DVV Cup.

References

External links 
 Player info, FIVB
 player info, CEV

1991 births
Living people
Dutch women's volleyball players
Dutch expatriate sportspeople in Germany
Dutch expatriate sportspeople in Italy
Expatriate volleyball players in Germany
Expatriate volleyball players in Italy
Sportspeople from Hengelo
Middle blockers